= Hasan Rind railway station =

Railway station in Pakistan

Coordinates: 25.102938°N 69.556724°E

General information
- Owner: Ministry of Railways

Other information
- Station code: HSNR

History
- Former names: Great Indian Peninsula Railway
Location

Hasan Rind railway station (Urdu: حسن رند ریلوے اسٹیشن) is located in Pakistan.

== See also ==
- List of railway stations in Pakistan
- Pakistan Railways
